Oakhurst is an unincorporated community and census-designated place (CDP) within Ocean Township, in Monmouth County, New Jersey, United States. As of the 2010 United States Census, the CDP's population was 3,995.

Geography
According to the United States Census Bureau, the CDP had a total area of 1.614 square miles (4.178 km2), including 1.611 square miles (4.171 km2) of land and 0.003 square miles (0.006 km2) of water (0.16%).

Demographics

Census 2010

Census 2000
As of the 2000 United States Census there were 4,152 people, 1,397 households, and 1,176 families living in the CDP. The population density was 989.6/km2 (2,570.0/mi2). There were 1,459 housing units at an average density of 347.7/km2 (903.1/mi2). The racial makeup of the CDP was 96.10% White, 0.75% African American, 2.29% Asian, 0.31% from other races, and 0.55% from two or more races. Hispanic or Latino of any race were 2.02% of the population.

There were 1,397 households, out of which 42.8% had children under the age of 18 living with them, 73.0% were married couples living together, 8.9% had a female householder with no husband present, and 15.8% were non-families. 13.8% of all households were made up of individuals, and 6.4% had someone living alone who was 65 years of age or older. The average household size was 2.97 and the average family size was 3.28.

In the CDP the population was spread out, with 28.3% under the age of 18, 5.9% from 18 to 24, 27.7% from 25 to 44, 27.1% from 45 to 64, and 11.1% who were 65 years of age or older. The median age was 38 years. For every 100 females, there were 98.1 males. For every 100 females age 18 and over, there were 94.6 males.

The median income for a household in the CDP was $75,026, and the median income for a family was $78,206. Males had a median income of $56,756 versus $41,429 for females. The per capita income for the CDP was $27,235. About 2.7% of families and 2.4% of the population were below the poverty line, including 3.1% of those under age 18 and 2.6% of those age 65 or over.

Transportation
New Jersey Transit offers train service on the North Jersey Coast Line at the Elberon station. NJ Transit bus service is available on the 832 and 837 local routes.

Notable people

People who were born in, residents of, or otherwise closely associated with Oakhurst include:
 Lou Barbaro (1916-1976), professional golfer.
 Michelle Davidson (born 1970), masters swimmer and a long distance, open water swimmer who accomplished the Triple Crown of Open Water Swimming, which includes crossing the English Channel and Catalina Channel, and circumnavigating Manhattan Island.
 Norma Eberhardt (1929-2011), actress.
 Rowland Hughes (1896-1957), Director of the Office of Management and Budget from 1954 to 1956.
 Chris Malachowsky (born ), electrical engineer who was one of the founders of the computer graphics company Nvidia.
 Kenny Pickett (born 1998), American football quarterback who was drafted 20th overall in the 2022 NFL Draft by the Pittsburgh Steelers.
 Jeffrey K. Tulis (born 1950), political scientist known for work that conjoins the fields of American politics, political theory, and public law.

References

Census-designated places in Monmouth County, New Jersey
Ocean Township, Monmouth County, New Jersey